The Pierra Menta has been an annual competition of ski mountaineering at Arêches-Beaufort in the region of Beaufort, Savoie south-eastern France since 1986. The Pierra Menta is one of the three best known races of the Alps (les grandes trois de ski de montagne) besides the Patrouille des Glaciers and the Trofeo Mezzalama.

Pierra Menta is a stage of La Grande Course that includes the most important ski mountaineering competitions of the season.

The athletes have to travel a cumulative altitude difference of around 10 000 meters, both ascending and skiing down. The race track is to be completed in teams of two and it varies year by year. The distance for the younger classes is shorter.

Top Ten lists

Literature 
 Rolf Majcen: Bergauf - Abenteuer Ausdauersport (German)

External links 
 official site (French)

References 

Ski mountaineering competitions
International sports competitions hosted by France
Sport in Savoie
1986 in French sport